The Renault Twingo is a four-seater passenger city car manufactured and marketed by the French automaker Renault, introduced in 1992 and currently in its third generation.

The first-generation Twingo (two door, front engine) debuted at the Paris Motor Show on 5 October 1992, receiving its formal market launch in continental European markets beginning in April 1993. Renault launched the second-generation Twingo (two door, front engine) in the summer of 2007 – and the third-generation Twingo (four door, rear engine) debuted at the 2014 Geneva Motor Show, receiving its formal market launch in September 2014.

The name "Twingo" is a portmanteau of the words twist, swing and tango.

First generation (1993)

The original Twingo was launched in April 1993, was sold in European LHD markets until August 2007, and received intermediate restylings in 1998, 2000, and 2004.

Development
Designed under the direction of Patrick Le Quément, Renault's chief designer, the car derived a concept developed through the W60 project when Gaston Juchet was Renault's chief designer. The project was aimed at replacing the Renault 4 with a minivan model.

Le Quément chose a Jean-Pierre Ploué design to develop the production version. Le Quément stretched the original prototype and added an unconventional front-end layout resembling a "smile". The interior equipment was mounted on a central console to free space. Renault had participated in the 1981 to 1984 'Mono-Box' ECO 2000 car project, along with PSA Peugeot Citroën and the French Government.

The Twingo I's electronic, centrally mounted instrument panel had a speedometer, fuel gauge, clock, odometer, and trip recorder controlled via a stalk-located button. A strip of warning lights was located behind the steering wheel. The rear seat featured a sliding mechanism to enable either increased boot space or more rear-seat legroom. The boot parcel shelf was attached to the inside of the tailgate, and lifted with the tailgate – or could clip back against the rear window when not required.

Engines
All engines were replaced with an eight-valve 1.15-litre  unit. A 16-valve  version was added in 2000.

Manufactured at the Flins Renault Factory from the time of its launch until 28 June 2007, the Twingo I was also manufactured in Taiwan, Spain, Colombia, and Uruguay from 1999 to 2002, remaining in production until 8 June 2012 in Colombia, by the Sofasa conglomerate, strictly for the domestic market.
Twingo I Safety

Euro NCAP results:
 Adult occupant: , score 23
 Pedestrian: , score 11

Timeline

In April 1993, the Twingo launched with only one trim level, and four exterior colors: coral red, Indian yellow, coriander green, and ultramarine blue. The car retailed at a price of 55,000FF (approximately €8,400). In June 1994, new exterior colors were introduced along with minor interior changes, as well as optional electric windows and mirrors, and locks with remote keyless entry. Four months later, the Twingo Easy model was launched, with an automated manual gearbox.

In September 1995, the first of many special Twingo editions launched, while inbuilt airbags become optional. In July 1996, a new 1149 cc engine (from the Clio) was fitted to replace the previous engine from the Renault 5. Alongside the new engine came the Twingo Matic model, equipped with a three-speed automatic gearbox. Also, various improvements were made, including the addition of a third brake light.

Two years later, the Twingo underwent its first major restyling of the interior and dashboard. The front and rear lights were revised, and front orange indicator lights were merged into the headlamp housings. The front of the car is reinforced for added safety in a frontal impact. Two months later, the top-of-the-range Twingo Initiale model launched.

In September 2000, the Twingo underwent its second major restyling. Additions included larger  wheels, revised door trims with larger door pockets, a black trunk opener lever (instead of shiny metal), and cup holders in front of the gearstick.

In April 2001, a new automated manual gearbox launched, called Quickshift. Additional revisions followed in September 2002, including new interior trims and wheel covers.

In Japan, Renault was formerly licensed by Yanase Co., Ltd., but in 1999, Renault purchased a stake in Japanese automaker Nissan after Nissan had faced financial troubles following the collapse of the Japanese asset price bubble in 1991 and subsequent lost decade. As a result of Renault's purchase of interest, Yanase cancelled its licensing contract with Renault in the spring of 2000, and Nissan Motor Co., Ltd took over as the sole licensee, hence sales of the Twingo I in Japan were transferred from Yanase Store locations to Nissan Red Stage Store locations.

September 2004 marked the third major Twingo revision. The Renault logo was fitted to the boot lid, side rubbing strips were added, and a new range of exterior colours launched. On 28 June 2007, Twingo I production ended in France, being replaced by the Twingo II. By 30 June 2007, 2,478,648 units from the Twingo I were produced. The Renault Twingo I production went on into Colombia until 8 June 2012. In total, 2.6 million units of the first-generation Twingo were produced.

Special models

Limited edition 
The first generation Twingo knew an important number of limited editions, including co-brandings with premium brands such as Perrier, Benetton, L'Oréal, Kenzo, Elite and artistic references including Metropolis, Grease and Tintin.

Twingo Lecoq 
The Renault Twingo Lecoq was a special edition produced in less than 50 units. It was an independent initiative of Carrosserie Lecoq.

Electric 
The French company Lormauto presented at the 2022 Paris Motor Show a kit to transform the Renault Twingo 1 into a fully electric car.

Second generation (2007)

After presenting an initial concept at the 2006 Mondial de l'Automobile, Renault debuted the production Twingo II at the 2007 Geneva Motor Show with French market trim levels named Authentique, Expression, Initiale, Dynamique, and GT. Using the floorpan of the Renault Clio II, the Twingo II offered improved crash protection and was available in LHD as well as RHD configurations. Production began in France and subsequently moved to the Revoz plant in Novo Mesto, Slovenia.

In January 2008, Renault debuted the Twingo Renaultsport 133, with a new  1,598 cc engine, at the 2008 Geneva Motor Show. In August 2013, ordering and production of the 133 model ended.

In July 2011, Renault debuted a facelifted Twingo II at the Frankfurt Motor Show, featuring a design language subsequently used on their entire range and offering revised fascias, as well as redesigned front and rear light clusters.

On series 14, episode four of Top Gear, presenter Jeremy Clarkson road tested the Twingo 133 on Belfast streets and barrel rolled upside down through a sewage tunnel. After numerous accidents, he raced to catch a departing ferry, instead landing in the ocean.

On 16 March 2011, the Renault Twingo won the "best city car award" in the Parkers' New Car Awards.

Special editions in the UK included the Twingo Renaultsport Gordini, Twingo Gordini TCe 100, Twingo Bizu, Twingo Pzaz, Twingo Renaultsport Silverstone GP, Twingo Miss Sixty, and Twingo Renaultsport Red Bull RB7.

In Japan, the Twingo II was licensed by Nissan Motor Co., Ltd. and sold exclusively through Nissan Store locations.

Twingo II safety

Euro NCAP results:

 Adult occupant: , score 28 (The model tested was not equipped with curtain airbags. Available as an option.)
 Pedestrian: , score 11

Engines

Third generation (2014)

The third generation Renault Twingo debuted in March 2014 at the Geneva Motor Show in a five-door, rear mid-engine, rear-wheel-drive layout. It was co-developed with Daimler's third generation Smart Fortwo and second generation Smart Forfour. The third generation Twingo and second generation Forfour are manufactured at the same factory in Novo Mesto, Slovenia.

The third-generation Twingo entered into production in May 2014 at Novo Mesto and was launched into the European market in September.

Design and development
In March 2010, Renault and Daimler, as part of their existing partnership, announced "Project Edison", a collaboration aimed at conceiving a shared platform for small city cars to be used by both companies. The Edison platform was designed from the start for mounting either an internal combustion engine or an electric motor as the main power source.

The first cars using the platform were the third-generation Twingo and the second-generation Smart Forfour. Renault and Daimler AG invested equally during the research and development phase, with Renault subsequently specializing in the engines and Daimler in transmissions.

Both companies tried to ensure a distinctive design. Renault designers took inspiration from the Renault 5 and the first generation Twingo. The car was originally launched with four colour options, as with the original Twingo.

In January 2019, an updated Twingo was introduced with a new front fascia, cosmetic changes inside and out, and a new base 1.0 L engine; at the same time, declining sales in the UK (just 877 were sold in 2018) led Renault UK to discontinue marketing the right-hand drive model.

Technical details

The Twingo III is about 10 mm shorter than the Twingo II. The rear-engine layout improves the manoeuvrability and the cabin space, but reduced the boot capacity. The suspension is composed by MacPherson struts on the front axle and a De Dion tube on the rear. The car uses a five-door architecture, which differs it from its three-door predecessors.

Brakes are ventilated disks on the front and drums on the rear, except in the base model (SCe 70), which uses drum brakes all round. The bonnet features a special opening mechanism and allows only partial opening to give access to the windscreen washer fluid, brake fluid and coolant reservoirs, and to the battery.

Equipment
The car originally offered four trim levels: Expression, Play, Dynamique, and Dynamique S, with various customization packs. One option connects a smartphone with an instrument panel cradle (R&Go) and has an infotainment system (R-Link). Other levels such as the "Energy" trim have since been added. The GT model arrived in November 2016.

Safety
As standard, the car incorporates tyre pressure sensors, seatbelt reminders, four airbags, and four head and chest side airbags. It achieved a four star Euro NCAP test rating in 2014.

Engines
The car originally came with a three-cylinder petrol engines, either a 0.9-litre turbocharged unit or a 1-litre atmospheric. Both are fitted low and in a 49° angle to increase boot's capacity. In November 2016 a more powerful version of the petrol engine, the TCe 110, arrived for the sporting Twingo GT model.

Advertising
In February 2014, Renault organised a "strip tweet" online event to promote the Twingo III. The manufacturer commissioned to Publicis the conception of the car's European advertising. Publicis hired French artists duo Kuntzel+Deygas for the design of the visual campaign with the theme "Go Anywhere, Go Everywhere."

In 2015, Renault released a short music video, "All new Twingo : Show me a car !", in which a twee styled woman is searching a nifty car. It ends with a reference to "Papa & Nicole" adverts for the Renault Clio : "Papa! – Nicole? – Your seatbelt!". The brief video got a viral success in the United Kingdom, with approximately  views in four weeks. A Pop Up Store was opened at the Crémerie de Paris.

Bēhance produced Life Designed software as part of Twingo launch.

Reception and awards
In the United Kingdom, the new Twingo won the "City Car of the Year" 2014, TopGear Magazine Awards, "City Car of the Year" in the UK Car of the Year Awards and "Best City Car" in the Daily Express 2014 Motoring Oscars, "Best City Car" at the 2015 British GQ Car Awards.

Paul Horrell of Top Gear gave the car a score of seven out of 10, calling it: "a genuinely different approach to design and engineering that has brought real dividends, not just in being different for its own sake. Most important, it's much more fun than a base model supermini for the same cash." Auto Express and its sister publication CarBuyer scored it four out of five stars, praising its manoeuvrability, design, and rear passenger space but criticizing its wind noise and high price compared to its rivals. What Car? gave the car three out of five stars, saying: "The Renault Twingo mixes cheeky retro styling with genuine practicality. It’s neither as refined nor as comfortable as the best city cars, though."

Concept cars
The third-generation Twingo was previewed through two concepts, the Twin'Z and the Twin'Run.

Twin'Z

The Twin'Z is a city car concept unveiled in April 2013. Its styling was created in partnership with British designer Ross Lovegrove. According to Renault's chief designer Laurens van den Acker, the purpose of its introduction was to "break down the boundaries between the world of an object whose calling is to be in movement, the automobile, and that of furniture." It has no B-pillar or dashboard and its doors open in conventional doors up front and suicide doors in the rear.

Twin'Run

The Twin'Run is a rear wheel drive hot hatch concept developed by Renault with assistance of Tork Engineering and Poclain Véhicules, unveiled in May 2013. It has double-wishbone independent suspension on both axles. The chassis is a tubular steel frame inspired by the Mégane Trophy and Renault 5 Turbo Maxi from WRC.

Twingo E-Tech Électrique

After plans to roll out new electric vehicles, including an electric Twingo, were confirmed in September 2019, Renault announced the Twingo Electric, marketed as the Twingo Z.E. (Zero Emissions) and in France as the Twingo E-Tech Électrique, the first-ever electric version of its city car, in February 2020 at the Geneva Motor Show. It is the second electric car from Renault, following the Zoe. The Twingo Z.E. drive train is based on that of the Smart EQ Forfour, with a larger battery. Renault CEO Luca de Meo confirmed in 2021 the entire Twingo range would be discontinued after the third generation, driven in part by the forthcoming Euro 7 emissions standards, which will be implemented in 2025. It is expected the A-segment Twingo will be replaced by the larger B-segment Renault 5 EV.

It was not marketed in the United Kingdom, following Renault's withdrawal of the Twingo range from the UK market after the car model's face lift in 2019. A limited edition "Vibes" model, based on the regular "Intens" trim, was announced in July 2020; the special Valencia Orange color was only available for the Vibes limited edition, but the Vibes could also be specified for any regular production color, and was later made available for the conventional petrol-engines Twingo. Trim levels in 2022 included the Life, Zen, Intens, and Urban Night.

The on-board charger, branded Caméléon, can accept AC electric supply at up to 22 kW; the lithium-ion battery, with 22 kW-hr capacity, incorporates lessons learned from the Renault Zoe. The battery itself weighs  and is positioned beneath the front seats. The vehicle is limited to AC charging sources only, as the vehicle supply interface port does not accept a DC fast charge plug. The default driving mode "D" emulates the behaviour of a petrol-powered car with moderate "engine braking" when the driver's foot is lifted from the throttle; a more aggressive and adjustable "B" regeneration mode is selectable, but does not allow one-pedal driving at the highest regeneration level.

The base trim ("Life") was criticized for lacking expected basic features such as a radio and air conditioning; however, the lack of vibrations and abundant low-end torque from the electric traction motor were appreciated for city traffic. The Twingo Electric was marketed against other low-cost city cars, such as the base model of the Fiat New 500 and Volkswagen E-up! and the VW's rebadged versions, the SEAT Mii electric and Škoda Citigo-e iV; internally, the Twingo also competed with the Dacia Spring; compared to the VW and Dacia, the Twingo Electric offered a smaller driving range.

References

External links

 (UK)

Twingo
2000s cars
2010s cars
City cars
Euro NCAP superminis
Front-wheel-drive vehicles
Hot hatches
Rear-engined vehicles
Rear-wheel-drive vehicles
Cars introduced in 1992